A supplemental type certificate (STC) is a civil aviation authority-approved major modification or repair to an existing type certified aircraft, engine or propeller. As it adds to the existing type certificate, it is deemed "supplemental".  In the United States issuance of such certificates is under the purview of the Federal Aviation Administration (FAA).

Advantages
Some civil aviation authorities also issue Limited or LSTCs that are only applicable to a single aircraft or small number of specific serial numbers.

Regulation
The United States regulations for STCs are found at 14 CFR 21.111.

The European Union regulations for STCs are found Commission Regulation (EU) No 748/2012 of 3 August 2012 as amended, Part-21, Subpart E et seq.

In 2010 at the US/Europe International Aviation Safety Conference, Eurocopter discussed concerns about potential risks with, and incompatibilities in, STCs.  In response the Modification and Replacement Parts Association  (MARPA) highlighted the success that the Parts Manufacturer Approval (PMA) industry had experienced in implementing Continued Operational Safety (COS) programs for the prediction and proactive addressing of hazards.

References

External links
 A scanned example of a Supplemental Type Certificate

Aviation licenses and certifications
Federal Aviation Administration